Mohammad Jawed is an Indian politician. He  was elected to the Lok Sabha, lower house of the Parliament of India from Kishanganj  constituency in the 2019 Indian general election as member of the Indian National Congress.

Early life 
Mohammad Jawed did his tenth grade (1979) and intermediate (1981) from The Air Force School (TAFS) in New Delhi. He has done MBBS from Govt. Medical College, Kashmir university in 1989. Later he moved into politics.

Personal life 
Mohammad Jawed is married to Yuman Hussain. He has two sons.

Political career 
In 1989, he entered politics. As an Indian National Congress candidate in 2000 Bihar Legislative Assembly election he won from Kishanganj Vidhan Sabha constituency. He was re-elected in Feb. 2005, 2010 & 2015 three terms for Bihar Legislative Assembly from Kishanganj Vidhan Sabha constituency. He resigned from his MLA post and contested the election for the Member of Parliament from the Congress Party in the 2019 General Election. He became the solo MP for Congress in Bihar state.

Apart from this he's currently the Secretary of AICC. He served as the Law, Animal husbandry and Fisheries minister, Chief whip during his tenure as a MLA. He's also a former working president of Bihar Pradesh Congress Committee.

References

External links

India MPs 2019–present
Lok Sabha members from Bihar
1963 births
Living people
People from Kishanganj district
Bihar MLAs 2015–2020